Vermont Route 14 (VT 14) is a  north–south state highway in northeastern Vermont, United States. It extends from U.S. Route 4 (US 4) and US 5 in White River Junction to VT 100 in Newport. Between White River Junction and the city of Barre, the route parallels Interstate 89 (I-89). VT 14 was originally designated in 1922 as part of the New England road marking system. Its north end was truncated in 1926 as a result of the designation of US 2 but was extended north along an old alignment of VT 12 in the 1960s.

Route description

White River Junction to East Montpelier
VT 14 begins at the intersection of US 4 and US 5 in White River Junction in the town of Hartford, at the confluence of the White River and the Connecticut River. VT 14 heads northwest as Maple Street, crossing under I-91 without an interchange, and continues through the town center of Hartford, along the north bank of the White River.  later it passes through the small village of West Hartford and soon enters the town of Sharon. After traveling another  along the river, VT 14 intersects with VT 132 in Sharon center and continues northwest into the town of Royalton, where it passes through the town's three villages along the White River. VT 14 first goes through South Royalton, where it has a junction with VT 110, then continues to follow the winding path of the river through Royalton center, finally reaching the village of North Royalton, where it meets with VT 107. From here, VT 14 turns north, leaving the main White River to follow the Second Branch of the White River. Less than  later, VT 14 enters the town of Randolph, passing through the village of South Randolph. After traveling north for another , VT 14 arrives in the village of East Randolph, where it has a junction with VT 66, which is signed for the Randolph town center.

VT 14 continues north for another  through the village of North Randolph before entering the town of Brookfield. Further north, VT 14 passes by Ainsworth State Park, which straddles the town line between Brookfield and Williamstown and also marks the upstream end of the Second Branch of the White River. VT 14 continues north through the narrow mountain pass of the state park and eventually arrives at the town center of Williamstown, where it intersects VT 64. After another , VT 14 crosses into the town of Barre. It proceeds through the village of South Barre, intersecting with VT 63, and continuing into the city of Barre. In Barre city, VT 14 runs along South Main Street for  until the junction with U.S. Route 302. US 302 and VT 14 overlap along North Main Street as they head into the city center. At the city center, the two overlapped routes split at a large four-way intersection that also includes a junction with VT 62, a short connector to I-89. US 302 heads northwest directly towards the city of Montpelier, while VT 14 heads north along Maple Avenue towards the town of East Montpelier. VT 14 briefly re-enters Barre town for about  before entering the town limits of East Montpelier. After , VT 14 crosses the Winooski River into the town center, where it meets U.S. Route 2.

East Montpelier to Newport
It soon enters the town of Calais, running for nearly  through the eastern part of this mostly rural town, including the village of East Calais, plus another  through the next town, Woodbury. Within Woodbury, it passes through the small town center, then continues past Greenwood Lake to run for several miles along the narrow river valley at the eastern edge of the Woodbury Mountains. Upon entering the next town, Hardwick, the valley opens up as the road approaches the town center, where the Lamoille River crosses east to west. VT 14 continues north along the west shore of Hardwick Lake, as the valley the road has been passing through narrows again. After , VT 14 briefly enters the town of Greensboro, where it passes along the shore of Lake Eligo, then continues northwest into the town of Craftsbury. VT 14 bypasses the small villages of the town, running along a more westerly track.

After traveling  through rural Craftsbury, VT 14 proceeds north into the town of Albany, where it runs for another , passing through the village of Albany along the way. North of Albany, VT 14 continues into the town of Irasburg, where it intersects VT 58 at the town center. After another  in northern Irasburg town, VT 14 enters Coventry, where it is immediately joined by U.S. Route 5 coming from the southeast. The two routes overlap for about  through Coventry center then separate, with US 5 heading north to the city of Newport and VT 14 heading northwest towards the town of Newport, where it ends at VT 100, less than  after crossing the town line. VT 100 and VT 105 continue into Newport Center.

History

19th century turnpikes
The roads of the southern half of modern VT 14 were improved at the beginning of the 19th century as various privately owned turnpikes. The oldest of these was the White River Turnpike, which was chartered on November 1, 1800. The road was to run  from the mouth of the White River to the point where it was joined by the Second Branch of the White River, and connected the settlements of White River Junction, Sharon, and Royalton. The toll road was in operation for 52 years. By the end of this period, receipts from the road had become very small due to the recent opening in 1850, along the same path as the turnpike, of a new railway line of the Vermont Central Railroad.

Another portion of modern VT 14, between East Brookfield and Williamstown center, was to be improved by another turnpike corporation, the Williamstown Center Turnpike, which was chartered on November 14, 1803. The charter provided that the road be turned over to the state after having been in operation for 25 years (later amended to 40 years). The company, however, did not do anything in its first two years of existence and only began laying out the road in 1805.

A third turnpike corporation, the Randolph Turnpike, was chartered on November 7, 1805, to build a  northward continuation of the White River Turnpike. The road of the Randolph Turnpike was to run from North Royalton to East Randolph. The corporation was dissolved by the state legislature on November 6, 1833.

Route designation

In 1922, the New England states adopted a region-wide system for route numbering. New England Route 14 was initially designated as a north–south route beginning at White River Junction, through Montpelier, to the city of Burlington. The route used modern VT 14 to Barre, then US 302 to Montpelier, and US 2 to Burlington. By 1925, an extension into New Hampshire had been designated continuing across the Connecticut River to Lebanon, New Hampshire and heading southeast to Franklin, along modern US 4 to Andover and New Hampshire Route 11 to Franklin.

At the end of 1926, the American Association of State Highway Officials formally established the U.S. Highway System and many of the New England inter-state routes were redesignated as U.S. Routes. The portion of New England Route 14 from Barre to Burlington was assigned to U.S. Route 2, while the portion in New Hampshire was assigned to U.S. Route 4. This shortened Route 14 in the south to US 4/US 5 in White River Junction, and in the north to US 2 in the city of Barre. In 1935, the portion of US 2 between Montpelier and St. Johnsbury was relocated to a more northerly alignment using a section of then Vermont Route 18. The old US 2 alignment was redesignated as US 302. VT 14 was extended northward several miles to East Montpelier, ending at the junction of newly relocated US 2 and Vermont Route 12.

On May 1, 1960, the northern half of Vermont Route 12 (north of Montpelier) was relocated to the "Montpelier-Morrisville State Highway", which connected Montpelier with the village of Morrisville. Originally, VT 12 continued north from Montpelier via East Montpelier to Hardwick and Barton, then overlapped with U.S. Route 5 to the city of Newport via Coventry. Between Hardwick and Coventry, VT 12 had an alternate route, Vermont Route 12B, that took a more westerly alignment via Albany. The relocation of the northern half of VT 12 to a new alignment resulted in the redesignation of its original northern alignment. The portion between Hardwick and Barton became a new Vermont Route 16. The portion between East Montpelier and Hardwick was assigned as an extension of VT 14. At the same time, VT 12B was also redesignated as a further northward extension of VT 14, including an additional  piece connecting to VT 100 in the town of Newport, resulting in the modern VT 14 alignment.

Major intersections

See also
 List of state highways in Vermont

References

External links

 Termini of Vermont Route 14

014
Transportation in Caledonia County, Vermont
Transportation in Orange County, Vermont
Transportation in Orleans County, Vermont
Transportation in Washington County, Vermont
Transportation in Windsor County, Vermont